Clement Rudolph "Clem" Simich or Šimić  (born 2 June 1939) is a New Zealand politician for the National Party.

Early life
Simich was born in Te Kōpuru, Northland in 1939.

Member of Parliament

He was first elected to Parliament in the 1992 by-election in Tamaki, which followed the retirement of former Prime Minister Robert Muldoon. He remained as MP for Tamaki until 2005, when he made way for Allan Peachey in Tamaki, and stood as the National candidate for Mangere instead. He became a list MP, having not succeeded in winning the Labour safe seat.

In August 1998, he was appointed to Cabinet, being Minister of Police, Minister of Racing, and Minister in Charge of the Audit Department. He also became Minister of Corrections in January 1999. He lost his ministerial positions, however, when National lost the 1999 election.

Simich served as Assistant Speaker of the House between 2002 and 2005. On the retirement of Jonathan Hunt, Simich stood for election as Speaker, but was defeated by Labour's Margaret Wilson.

Simich became the Deputy Speaker of the House after the 2005 election.

He retired from parliament in 2008, before that year's general election.

Simich is of Croatian (in Croatian the surname is Šimić) and also Māori descent.

References

External links
 Picture of Hon Clem Simich c1998
 Retirement announced

1939 births
Living people
New Zealand National Party MPs
Māori MPs
Members of the Cabinet of New Zealand
New Zealand people of Croatian descent
New Zealand list MPs
People from Te Kōpuru
Members of the New Zealand House of Representatives
21st-century New Zealand politicians